Ian Robert "Dosser" Smith (born 26 November 1957), is an English schoolmaster, director of Coaching at Oakham School, and former player (in the flanker position), captain in the mid-1980s, and later coach of Leicester Tigers.  He made 331 first XV appearances for Leicester, including five John Player Cup Finals (1978–1982), of which three were won, and scored a total of 67 tries.  However, he was not capped by England.  His son, centre/winger Matt Smith played for Leicester Tigers from 2006-2019.

References

1957 births
Living people
English rugby union coaches
English rugby union players
Leicester Tigers coaches
Leicester Tigers players
Rugby union players from Leicester